Jacques de Bourbon may refer to:

 Jacques de Bourbon-Busset (1912–2001), French novelist, essayist and politician
 Jaime, Duke of Madrid (1870–1931), also known as Jacques de Bourbon, Duke of Anjou, Carlist claimant to the throne in Spain and legitimate claimant to the throne in France
 James I, Count of La Marche (1319–1362), also known as Jacques de Bourbon, Count of La Marche, son of Louis I, Duke of Bourbon and Mary of Avesnes